Petra is a feminine given name. It is a feminine form of Peter, which is derived from the Greek word "πέτρα"  meaning "stone, rock". It is also a common first name in German-speaking countries, the Czech Republic, Finland, Sweden, Croatia, Hungary, Macedonia, Slovenia, Bulgaria, Serbia, Slovakia.

Name day 
June 29 is the name day of Peter and Petra. October 2 is the name day of Petra in Hungary.

Variants 
 Bulgarian: Петра (Petra), Петранка (Petranka), Петруна (Petruna), Петя (Petya), Пена (Pena), Пенка (Penka), Пейка (Peyka, female variant of Peyo), Петка (Petka, could also be derived from the Bulgarian word for Friday (Петък))
Slovak: Peťka, Peťa, Peti, Peťuš, Peťuška, Peťuša, Petruška, Peťula, Peťulka, Peťulik, Peťuli
 Czech: Petruš, Petruška, Péťa, Pétina, Pétis 
 French: Perette, Pierrette, Pierrine
 Frisian: Peekje, Pietje, Pierke, Pierkje, Piertje, Peterke, Petje, Petke, Pieterke
 German: Peti, Petrina, Petrine, Pezi, Petzi, Pedi
 Greek: Πετρούλα (Petroula)
 Italian: Piera, Pierina
 Macedonian: Петра (Petra), Петранка (Petranka)

Notable people with this given name 
Notable people with this given name include:
 Petra Bagust (born 1972), New Zealand television presenter
 Petra Barran, British entrepreneur
 Petra Begerow (born 1975), German tennis player
 Petra Bockle (born 1995), Kenyan rapper
 Petra Burka (born 1946), Canadian figure skater
 Petra Cetkovská (born 1985), Czech tennis player
 Petra Collins (born 1992), Canadian photographer
 Petra Conti (born 1988), Italian ballerina
 Petra Döll, German hydrologist 
 Petra Ecclestone (born 1988), Croatian-English model and fashion designer, daughter of Bernie Ecclestone
 Petra Ekerum (born 1980), Swedish politician
 Petra Felke (born 1959), German athlete
 Petra Frey (born 1978), Austrian singer
 Petra Haden (born 1971), American singer and violinist
 Petra Kamstra (born 1974), Dutch former tennis player
 Petra Kelly (1947–1992), German politician
 Petra Kronberger (born 1969), Austrian alpine skier
 Petra Kusch-Lück (born 1948), German host and singer
 Petra Kvitová (born 1990), Czech tennis player
 Petra Langrová (born 1970), Czech former tennis player
 Petra Laseur (born 1939), Dutch actress
 Petra Levin, American microbiologist
 Petra Mandula (born 1978), Hungarian tennis player
 Petra Markham (born 1944), British actress
 Petra Marklund (born 1984), Swedish singer, pseudo "September"
 Petra Majdič (born 1979), Slovenian cross-country skier
 Petra Martić (born 1991), Croatian tennis player
 Petra Mede (born 1970), Swedish comedian and television host
 Petra Morsbach (born 1956), German author
 Petra Němcová (born 1979), Czech mannequin and photo model
 Petra Pau (born 1963), German politician
 Petra Pfaff (born 1960), German track and field hurdler
 Petra Pinn (1881-1958), American nurse, hospital administrator
 Petra Rampre (born 1980), Slovenian tennis player
 Petra Rossner (born 1966), German cyclist
 Petra Schmidt-Schaller (born 1980), German actress
 Petra Schneider (born 1963), German swimmer
 Petra Schürmann (1933–2010), German television host and actress
 Petra Taylor, a character from British soap opera Brookside
 Petra van Staveren (born 1966), Dutch swimmer
 Petra de Steur (born 1972), Belgian singer also known as La Sakhra
 Petra Văideanu (born 1965), Romanian heptathlete
 Petra Verkaik (born 1966), American model
 Petra Vlhová (born 1995), Slovak alpine skier
 Petra Weis (born 1957), German politician, member of the Bundestag
 Petra Wimbersky (born 1982), German football player
 Petra Yared (born 1979), Australian actress

Fictional characters 
 Petra (comics), in Marvel Comics
 Petra, in Broken Sword: The Sleeping Dragon
 Petra, in the webcomic Okashina Okashi – Strange Candy
 Petra, a character from Minecraft: Story Mode.
 Petra Arkanian, in a book series by Orson Scott Card
 Petra, a character from Horizon Zero Dawn.
 Petra Andalee, the protagonist that appears in Blue Balliett's Chasing Vermeer and The Wright 3
 Petra Johanna Lagerkvist, a character from the Arcana Heart video game series
Petra Leyte, a character from the Re:Zero − Starting Life in Another World anime/light novel series
Petra Macneary, a character from the video game Fire Emblem: Three Houses
 Petra Ral, a character from the Attack On Titan anime series
 Queen Petra of Siphnos, a queen from Goddess of Yesterday
Petra Solano, a character from TV series Jane The Virgin
 Petra Strorm, in John Wyndham's novel The Chrysalids
 Petra Venj, the main story agent in the "House of Wolves" expansion from the video game Destiny

See also
 Petra (disambiguation)

References

Feminine given names